Inspire is the first full-length studio album by visual kei rock group La'Mule. The album was released through Bandai Music Entertainment on December 2, 1998. Two songs from the album, Mind Control and Usagi no Tsumi, had been released earlier that year as a double single.

Track listing

References

Japanese-language albums
La'Mule albums
1998 albums